The White and Middleton Gas Engine Company was a manufacturer of internal combustion engines in the late 19th and early 20th centuries headquartered in Baltimore, Maryland, in the United States.

Company history 

The company was founded and operated during most of its existence by Charles White and Arthur R. Middleton. The company exhibited in the Machinery Hall at the 1893 World's Fair in Chicago.

The engines the company manufactured could be powered either by natural gas or by gasoline. They were employed for such varied uses as powering riverboats, generating electricity for local power grids, grinding coffee for both industrial coffee processors and coffee shops, and driving submarines.

White and Middleton engines were used both in the original Victorian era Argonaut-class submarines of Simon Lake and in the Protector-class submarines built by the Lake Torpedo Boat Company of Bridgeport, Connecticut and sold to the German, Austro-Hungarian, and Russian Imperial Navies during the decade preceding World War I.  Two later Lake submarine models, the G-1 and G-2 which were purchased by the United States Navy, also used White and Middleton engines. A White and Middleton engine powered the electrical generator for Vanderbilt's Biltmore Estate in Asheville, North Carolina.

The rising success of the company as the new century dawned permitted the opening of a distribution subsidiary in Chicago, Illinois. In 1912 Charles White purchased Arthur R. Middleton's interest in the company and the firm was dissolved by mutual agreement, with the engines continuing to be produced by The Charles White Gas Engine Company. The company was eventually sold to Richard Thomas. Later U.S. Naval records list the company headquarters as Springfield, Ohio.

Products 

In 1898 White and Middleton produced nine different sizes of engine. Some models were approved by Underwriters Laboratories.

Performance data

References

External links 
 —Photo from the late 20th century that appears to include the son of Arthur Middleton and a restored White and Middleton engine in the background.

Engine manufacturers of the United States
Manufacturing companies based in Baltimore